Tenala is a former municipality in Uusimaa, Finland. It was neighboured by Hanko, Kisko, Perniö, Pohja, Särkisalo and Ekenäs.

The municipality was established in 1329. The stone church of Tenala was built in late 15th century and the paintings on the piers are from the 17th century. The bell tower of the church was renovated in 1762. In 1988, Tenala had 2991 inhabitants living in an area of 443.6 km2 and 86.96% of the inhabitants spoke Swedish as their native language. In 1993, the municipality consolidated with Ekenäs. In 2009, Tenala became a part of the newly established city of Raseborg.

Notable residents 
Ingeborg Norell, heroine of 1780
Fredrik Stjernvall, senator

References

External links 
Tenala church website

Former municipalities of Finland
Populated places established in the 1320s
1329 establishments in Europe
Populated places disestablished in 1993